Dirk Gidney (born 23 April 1952) is a Canadian rower. He competed in the men's eight event at the 1976 Summer Olympics.

References

1952 births
Living people
Canadian male rowers
Olympic rowers of Canada
Rowers at the 1976 Summer Olympics
People from Bryn Mawr, Pennsylvania